Bhutan made their Asian Para Games debut in the 2018 edition of the games which was held in Jakarta, Indonesia from 6 to 13 October 2018.

The country's National Paralympic Committee, the Bhutan Paralympic Committee, has been recently established at the time of the games, having been founded in 2017. Bhutan was represented by two athletes; Pema Rigsel who competed in archery and Kinley Dem who participated in the shooting competition. Princess Ashi Euphelma Choden Wangchuck, the President of the Bhutan Paralympic Committee (BPC) was the delegation's chief.

Archery
Pema Rigsel competed in the 70 metres wheelchair recurve archery event.

Shooting
Kinley Dem participated in the 10 metres wheelchair rifle shooting event.

See also
 Bhutan at the 2018 Asian Games

References

 
2018
Nations at the 2018 Asian Para Games
Para